The TA BlueTech Index is a stock market index all capitalised information technology and biotechnology companies listed on the Tel Aviv Stock Exchange (TASE). The index was launched on 3 April 2011 as the TA BlueTech-50 Index and replaced by the Tel-Tech Index and the Tel-Tech 15 Index.
In June 2014, as a result of changes in the criteria required for companies to be listed in the Index, its name was changed to "TA BlueTech Index".

History
The TA BlueTech-50 Index was launched as part of an effort by the Tel Aviv Stock Exchange to transform itself into a leading global exchange for high-tech companies and lure more overseas investment. Additionally, the Exchange has hoped to attract Israeli technology companies that historically been listing on the NASDAQ to list in TASE. The TA-Technology Index, which includes all the Information Technology companies listed on TASE, was launched at the same time. The TA-Biomed Index, which includes all the Biotechnology and Biomedical engineering companies om TASE was launched one year earlier. The BlueTech-50 included the 50 most highly capitalised companies from both indices.

In May 2014, the Tel Aviv Stock Exchange launched a new Index called TA Tech-Elite Index, comprising all the companies listed on either TA-Biomed Index or TA-Technology Index with a market worth of at least 400 million NIS. Also, in order to attract new companies, it was decided that under some circumstances new companies will be allowed to be listed on Tech-Elite Index if their market worth is at least 200 million NIS.

In accordance with the launching of Tech-Elite, it was decided that the BlueTech index will include all companies listed on TA-Technology Index and TA-Biomed Index, starting 15 June 2014.

Constituents
Constituents of the TA BlueTech-50 Index as of 1 September 2011

See also
Economy of Israel
Silicon Wadi
List of Israeli companies quoted on the Nasdaq

References

External links
TASE web site

Tel Aviv Stock Exchange
Israeli stock market indices